The Alberta College of Social Workers (ASCW) serves as the regulatory body for the profession of social work in the province of Alberta, Canada. It is among 30 healthcare professions legislated under the Alberta's Health Profession Act (HPA). The College provides membership activities that promote the engagement of ethical social work practice as well as policies, programs, and services that enhance the public interest.

History
The Alberta College of Social Workers represents the whole of the social work profession in Alberta, campaigning for different policies and services that exercise ethical social work application."

Health Professions Act
The Alberta College of Social Workers, first created in the 1961 as the Alberta Association of Social Workers, made continuous efforts, for a series of years, to become part of the Health Professions Act (HPA). This legislation requires professional colleges to follow similar regulations and for the members to apply educational and practice standards. The ACSW attained a prominent breakthrough by becoming a member of the Health Professions Act, on April 1, 2003, by demonstrating meticulous efforts in obtaining mandatory registration, between 2001 and 2003. Becoming a member of the HPA was an important goal for the Alberta College resulting in increased public recognition and credibility as a self-regulated profession.

Provincial scale
Alberta is one of the provinces to not have official poverty reduction plans enforced provincially as opposed to Ontario, Quebec, Manitoba, Nova Scotia, Newfoundland and Labrador. To compensate, the ASCW delivers reports on the current status of social justice issues. For example, the ACSW Social Policy Framework 2010: Visioning a more equitable and just Alberta, discussed the inequalities and the economic lifestyle as well as the quality of life all across the province. The policy is the second part of the Disparity Gap Project, an initiation to reduce the growing gap between the rich and the poor. Diana Gibson, the lead researcher of the project, presented the following recommendations to Rachel Notley and Harry Chase, members of the New Democratic Party and Liberal Party of Canada respectively:
Long-term, stable funding for social programs
Low cost child-care spaces
Increased effort to affordable housing
Increased benefits to poverty-line rates
Propose to the government to install a living wage policy
These are some of the few aspects that the college would like to implement within the province with the goal of providing economic equality. The ACSW participated in protests of budget cuts to public services under the direction of Gil McGowan, president of the Alberta Federation of Labour, on March 21, 2010, and continues to play an active role in the discrimination of social inequality.

Regional scale
On a regional scale, coordinators from different areas throughout the province stimulate the arrangement of meetings with members of the local community on current matters of interest. Meetings take the form of workshops and events. Regional coordinators provide different activities such as:
Calgary area: competency workshops for all social workers in the area
     Dementia: Developing a Positive Perspective
     Critical Experiential Social Work
     Contemplative End of Life: Introduction and practice for social workers caring for patients who are dying and their families
     Sacred Dance
     Creating a Foundation for Living an Inspired Life
     Lunch Hour Yoga Session
Edmonton area:
	Social Policy Framework Presentation: A three-hour presentation about the social policy framework developed by the Alberta College of Social Workers in collaboration with Parkland Institute
	A two-day workshop on Racism: Understanding Racism with The Centre for Race & Culture
	Families First Edmonton: Making a Difference for Children / Social Work Week Luncheon: A Families First Edmonton Workshop presented by ACSW's Children's Issues Interest Group

Mission statement
A mission statement offers, to the general public, a summary of the prominent elements being focused on by a social justice organization. A statement consists of both short-term and long-term goals depending on the importance of the issue being identified. Under the Health Professions Act, all professions are required to engage in a series of procedures under the approved schedules and regulations admitted by the Act. The ACSW focuses on the following social justice issues based on the Health Profession Act:

	Ensure that the public is protected and offered a voice on social injustices.
	Ameliorate and direct social work practices.
	Enforce standards for registration, unconditional competence, and standards of practice from all social workers.
	Maintain and enforce the code of ethics with the social work profession.
	Approve educational programs in respect to registration processes.

Activities
Since 2006, attendance at the ACSW Annual Conference attracts more than one thousand social workers. Each event focuses on the ethics and professional practice of social work, making it one of the largest in North America.

The Annual Conference has the following goals:
To share social work practice experiences.
To present recent developments and future aspirations within the profession.
To showcase an efficient way of offering care, autonomy, and independence to the population that are looking for social justice and that social workers assist; providing ethical practice.
To provide networking opportunities for social workers.

In 2012, the ACSW Annual Conference held in Edmonton, included key-note speaker Brene Brown, named one of "The 50 Most Influential Women of 2009." The 2012 conference theme was "Social Work: Celebrating the Person and the Professional."

Advocacy
No More Service Cuts (2001–2002)
In 2001, the No More Service Cuts campaign was initiated by the ACSW to provide awareness of government funding cuts that stemmed the reduction of services for children when the demand had augmented by nine percent. The campaign promoted information on this social issue through the use of billboards, website postings and newspaper advertisements. The significance of the change in the Children's Services budget was inconsequential, but led to an amplified awareness on the Alberta College of Social Workers by the public.

Raise Income Support Rates (2001–2003)
In 2002, Raise Income Support Rates campaign was launched, stressing the low rates for income support programs. Awareness was presented through the use of billboard campaigns, website postings, and meetings with government officials and leaders. The increase in the income rate was discreet, but led to the recognition of the college and the invitation to participate in social justice related discussions.

Closing the Disparity Gap (2008–)
Alberta College of Social Workers has significantly contributed to the Closing the Disparity Gap Campaign in efforts to increase economic and financial discrepancies in two phases:
Phase 1: launch a campaign on the issue of Alberta's disparity gap and the impact it holds on social work.
Phase 2: work on attaining positive change in social policies and programs from the foundation of knowledge and awareness fashioned in phase 1.

Closing the Disparity Gap has the following goals:
Raise awareness on the issue of the separating gap that contributes to Alberta's social problems
Be proactive and provide different way of closing the gap
Work, in affiliation with the government, to apply efficient social policy programs.
Closing the Disparity Gap desires the following outcomes:
Improvement of condition for the individuals being affected by the income disparity
Increased importance of political force for the Alberta College of Social Workers
Enhanced value of the social work profession

Dignity for All
Dignity for All is a campaign, developed by the Salvation Army that aspires to make Canada a poverty-free country, providing social security and cohesiveness nationally, by 2020. The campaign works at independent and local levels, reaching one client at a time, providing a sense of community, hope, and belonging for the individuals in need of help.
The Dignity for All Campaign includes the following goals :
For the federal government to provide a comprehensive and integrative plan for poverty elimination.
The enactment of a federal act that ensures social development
Provide enough federal revenue to engage in social security.
Alberta College of Social Workers is one of the 571 groups and 9143 individuals that support Dignity for All and promotes prominent news and information on the campaign to social work community. On February 14, 2012, Dignity for All hosted "What's next: How do we address poverty in Canada," where the ACSW promoted information of the event, on its website, and encouraged all members and active participants of the college to attend.

Child Poverty Awareness
Child poverty is a social justice issue that Alberta College of Social Workers dynamically participates in. With the increasing number of children living in poverty, the ACSW looks at different contributing factors that contribute to this issue as well as develop prominent strategies that will reduce poverty rates within families allowing children to live in between conditions. The In This Together: Ending Poverty in Alberta, is a report developed in collaboration between the Public Interest Alberta, Alberta College of Social Workers, and Edmonton Social Planning Council. It looks, in depth, at child and family poverty in Alberta. Together, the organizations work to establish different solutions that will decrease the overall poverty line within the province by :
Implement current concepts that effective
Obtain the government's active support
Provide gender equality
Provide affordable rents and ownerships

The Parkland Institute Research in association with the Alberta College of Social Workers created a report on the ACSW Social Policy Framework 2010: Visioning a more equitable and just Alberta. With the ACSW making contributing advances in poverty existing within the province of Alberta and looking at different ways to improve the socio-economic policies, the report evaluated the policy and identified the following aspects:
Causes and Consequences:
	Key aspects of disparity: effects of minimum wage, unemployment rates, social assistance rates
	Key causes of disparity: tax cut agenda, stalled social spending, labour markets, offloading of community services
	Solutions such as:
	Strengthen community services, provide a better quality of life for Albertans, invest in house affordability, and protect workers

Organizational structure
The Alberta College of Social Worker has a total of 18 staff members including seven social workers on staff. There are several hundred volunteers that serve the ACSW, offering their time in many different spheres within the organization such as:
	Regulatory Committees: Clinical Committee, Competence Committee, Professional Social Work Education Board and Registration Committee.
       Governance Committees: Executive Committee, Human Resources Committee, Bylaws & Policy Committee and Finance Committee.
       Standing & Adhoc Committees: Nominations & Recruitment Committee, Indigenous Social Work Committee, Advocate Editorial Board, Communications Committee and Bursary Committee.
       Interest Groups: Annual Conference, Area Coordinators & Regional Events, Children's Issues – Edmonton, Children's Issues – Calgary, Social Action/ Social Justice – Edmonton, Calgary Social Workers for Social Justice, Northern Alberta Gerontology Social Work Interest Group, Gerontological Social Work Action Group – Calgary, Social Workers in Health, International Social Work, Private Practice Interest Group and Retired Social Workers.

References

External links
 

Organizations based in Alberta